The 18th Los Angeles Film Critics Association Awards, honoring the best in film for 1992, were given on 12 December 1992.

Winners
Best Picture:
Unforgiven
Runner-up: The Player
Best Director:
Clint Eastwood – Unforgiven
Runner-up: Robert Altman – The Player
Best Actor:
Clint Eastwood – Unforgiven
Runner-up: Denzel Washington – Malcolm X
Best Actress:
Emma Thompson – Howards End
Runner-up: Alfre Woodard – Passion Fish
Best Supporting Actor:
Gene Hackman – Unforgiven
Runner-up: Sydney Pollack – Husbands and Wives, Death Becomes Her, and The Player
Best Supporting Actress:
Judy Davis – Husbands and Wives
Runner-up: Miranda Richardson – The Crying Game, Damage, and Enchanted April
Best Screenplay:
David Webb Peoples – Unforgiven
Runner-up: Neil Jordan – The Crying Game
Best Cinematography:
Zhao Fai – Raise the Red Lantern (Da hong deng long gao gao gua)
Runner-up: Jack N. Green – Unforgiven
Best Music Score:
Zbigniew Preisner – Damage
Runner-up: Mark Isham – A River Runs Through It
Best Foreign Film:
The Crying Game • UK/Japan
Runner-up: Raise the Red Lantern (Da hong deng long gao gao gua) • China/Hong Kong/Taiwan
Best Non-Fiction Film (tie):
Black Harvest
Threat
Best Animation:
Aladdin
Experimental/Independent Film/Video Award:
Sadie Benning – It Wasn’t Love 
New Generation Award:
Carl Franklin – One False Move
Career Achievement Award:
Budd Boetticher

References

External links
 18th Annual Los Angeles Film Critics Association Awards

1992
Los Angeles Film Critics Association Awards
Los Angeles Film Critics Association Awards
Los Angeles Film Critics Association Awards
Los Angeles Film Critics Association Awards